Miriam Jane Alice Davies (born 2 June 1975), known as Mims Davies, is a British Conservative Party politician serving as the Member of Parliament (MP) for Mid Sussex since 2019. She has been serving as Parliamentary Under Secretary of State for Social Mobility, Youth and Progression since October 2022. She served as a Parliamentary Under-Secretary of State for Safeguarding from September to October 2022.

Davies was first elected as the Member of Parliament (MP) for Eastleigh in May 2015. She was the Parliamentary Under-Secretary of State for Sport, Civil Society and Loneliness in Theresa May's government from 2018 to 2019. After Boris Johnson became Prime Minister in July 2019, Davies was appointed Parliamentary Under-Secretary of State for Employment at the Department for Work and Pensions. She was elected in the 2019 election as the MP for Mid Sussex. She resigned as Employment Minister in July 2022, after losing confidence in Johnson's leadership.

Early life and career 
Davies was educated at the Royal Russell School in London and Collyers Sixth Form College in Horsham, and studied Politics and International Relations at Swansea University; she was the first in her family to enter higher education. She worked primarily as a local radio presenter, reporter and producer. She later worked as a road safety communications officer with the Automobile Association, the police force and Sussex Safer Roads Partnership.

Political career 
Davies served as a Conservative Party town councillor for Haywards Heath Town Council and as a District councillor on Mid Sussex District Council for the Haywards Heath Lucastes ward from 2011 to 2015. Davies was initially co-opted onto Hurstpierpoint and Sayers Common Parish Council, which began her political involvement.

At the 2015 general election on 7 May, Davies was elected as MP for Eastleigh defeating Liberal Democrat incumbent Mike Thornton by over 9,000 votes. She was re-elected in the 2017 general election, increasing her share of the vote by 8.2% and receiving over half of the total votes in the constituency, the first majority vote in Eastleigh since the 1992 election.

She campaigned for the UK to leave the European Union during the 2016 referendum.

Davies was appointed an Assistant Government Whip on 9 January 2018, and subsequently to the role of Parliamentary Under-Secretary of State for Wales on 26 July 2018.

In the House of Commons she sat on the Commons Reference Group on Representation and Inclusion and previously sat on the Consolidation Bills (Joint Committee) and Women and Equalities Committee. On 23 October 2018, Davies resigned from a committee chaired by Commons Speaker John Bercow, citing lack of confidence in Bercow's ability to tackle bullying and sexual harassment problems in Parliament.

On 5 November 2018, Davies was appointed Minister for Sport and Civil Society at the Department for Digital, Culture, Media and Sport, after the resignation of Tracey Crouch over a delay to the introduction of reduced limits on the stakes of fixed-odds betting terminals.

In February 2019, in her role as Sports Minister, she called for an urgent summit with football leaders in order to address issues relating to abuse in the sport. She suggested there should be a zero tolerance approach to problems concerning racist, homophobic and antisemitic chanting.

In May 2019, she attended the "End the cage age" event campaigning against caged birds. This event was organised by Compassion in World Farming. Davies stated that she was against caged laying hens.

In July 2019, new prime minister Boris Johnson appointed Davies to the position of Parliamentary Under-Secretary of State for Employment at the Department for Work and Pensions.

On 30 October 2019, Davies announced she would be standing down as MP for Eastleigh in order to spend more time with her children and later announced she was to be on the shortlist for the Mid Sussex constituency, where Nicholas Soames was retiring. On 9 November, she was selected to stand for the seat, which she won at the 2019 general election with 53.3% of the vote.

She resigned on 6 July 2022 from her position as Parliamentary Under-Secretary at the Department for Work and Pensions, losing confidence in Boris Johnson as a result of the Chris Pincher scandal.

Personal life 
She was a carer to her two elderly parents before becoming an MP, and this experience informed a significant portion of her parliamentary work. She is a keen runner and has completed several long-distance races, including the 2017 London Marathon.

Notes

References

External links

 

1975 births
Conservative Party (UK) councillors
Conservative Party (UK) MPs for English constituencies
Councillors in West Sussex
People from Mid Sussex District
Female members of the Parliament of the United Kingdom for English constituencies
Living people
People educated at Royal Russell School
Place of birth missing (living people)
UK MPs 2015–2017
UK MPs 2017–2019
UK MPs 2019–present
21st-century British women politicians
21st-century English women
21st-century English people
Women councillors in England
British Eurosceptics